The 2001 Rutgers Scarlet Knights football team represented Rutgers University in the 2001 NCAA Division I-A football season. The Scarlet Knights were led by new head coach Greg Schiano and played their home games at Rutgers Stadium. They are a member of the Big East Conference. They finished the season 2–9, 0–7 in Big East play to finish in last place.  Due to the Terrorist Attacks of September 11th, Rutgers September 15 home game against California was postponed until November 23.

Schedule

Roster

References

Rutgers
Rutgers Scarlet Knights football seasons
Rutgers Scarlet Knights football